Volleyball at the 2013 Islamic Solidarity Games is held in PSCC Competition Hall, Palembang, Indonesia from 23 to 30 September 2013.

Medalists

Beach

Indoor

Medal table

Results

Preliminary round

Group A

|}

|}

Group B

|}

|}

Final round

Semifinals

|}

3rd place

|}

Final

|}

References

Asian Volleyball Confederation

External links
Official website
2013 South Sumatera

2013 Islamic Solidarity Games
Islamic Solidarity Games
International volleyball competitions hosted by Indonesia
2013